The 1906 Minnesota Golden Gophers football team represented the University of Minnesota in the 1906 college football season. In their sixth year under head coach Henry L. Williams, the Golden Gophers compiled a 4–1 record (2–0 against Western Conference opponents) and outscored all opponents 47 to 29.

Schedule

References

Minnesota
Minnesota Golden Gophers football seasons
Big Ten Conference football champion seasons
Minnesota Golden Gophers football